Kairo Ellis Mitchell (born 21 October 1997) is a footballer who is a striker for Eastleigh on loan from Notts County and the Grenada national team.

Club career

Early career
A product of the Leicester City F.C. Reserves and Academy, Mitchell had a successful season with Leicester's under-18s in the 2015–16 season, as well as appearing for the reserves. When he finished his scholarship with Leicester City, he was offered a contract. A year later, he was released by Leicester when his contract expired.

Nuneaton Town
In 2017, following his release from Leicester, Mitchell joined National League North side Nuneaton Town. On 27 August 2018, Mitchell scored his first league goal for the club, in a 3–1 defeat to Brackley Town.

Coalville Town
In November 2018, Mitchell joined Coalville Town on an 18-month contract. He scored on his debut in a 1–1 draw against St Neots Town the following day.

Dartford
On 2 October 2020, Mitchell joined Dartford. His only appearance for the club came as a substitute in a 1–0 home defeat to Slough Town the FA Cup Second Qualifying Round on Saturday 3 October 2020.

King's Lynn Town
On 22 October 2020, Mitchell joined King's Lynn Town.

Chesterfield
On 10 April 2021, with King's Lynn due to play Chesterfield, it was announced that Mitchell had joined the Derbyshire club for an undisclosed fee subject to league approval. Although ineligible to play in the match, Mitchell's new club came from behind to win 2–1.

Notts County
On 3 August 2021, Mitchell signed for Notts County for an undisclosed fee on a two year contract.

On 2 February 2023, Mitchell signed for Eastleigh on loan until the end of the season.

International career
Mitchell debuted for the Grenada national team in a 5–0 friendly loss to Panama on 25 October 2017.

Career statistics

Club

International

Scores and results list Grenada's goal tally first, score column indicates score after each Mitchell goal.

References

External links
 
 
 Sky Sports Profile
 Premier League Profile

1997 births
Living people
People from Leicester
English sportspeople of Grenadian descent
Grenadian footballers
English footballers
Association football forwards
Grenada international footballers
2021 CONCACAF Gold Cup players
Leicester City F.C. players
Nuneaton Borough F.C. players
Coalville Town F.C. players
Dartford F.C. players
King's Lynn Town F.C. players
Chesterfield F.C. players
Notts County F.C. players
Eastleigh F.C. players
National League (English football) players
Southern Football League players
Black British sportspeople